Jack McCaffrey (born 19 October 1993) is a Gaelic footballer who plays for Clontarf.

Early and personal life
His father Noel also represented Dublin in football. McCaffrey attended Belvedere College private school and  studied medicine at University College Dublin (UCD) and graduated in 2018 with a Bachelor of Medicine, Bachelor of Surgery & Bachelor in the Art of Obstetrics. His classmates included Mark English, considered by Jerry Kiernan to be the country's "greatest talent" ever in middle-distance running. English issued a challenge to McCaffrey, himself considered football's fastest player, to take him on over 100 metres.

McCaffrey is a qualified medical doctor. He works in Temple Street Children's Hospital.

He is an opponent of professionalism within the GAA.

Playing career
In April 2013, McCaffrey won a National Football League winners' medal as Dublin defeated Tyrone by 0–18 to 0–17 to win the 2013 National Football League. He made his championship debut against Westmeath in the 2013 Leinster Senior Football Championship. He scored a solo goal in the 2013 All-Ireland quarter-final against Cork. Still teenaged, he played in the 2013 All-Ireland Senior Football Championship Final, the first such final he would play in. McCaffrey, who was substituted at half-time, recalled how he "got roasted by Kevin McLoughlin". He played twice and netted for Ireland against Australia in the 2013 International Rules Series. In November 2013, he was named as All Stars Young Footballer of the Year.

In November 2015, McCaffrey received the highest individual honour in the sport when he was named as All Stars Footballer of the Year. He did so in spite of contracting food poisoning "in around the Thursday" before the 2015 All-Ireland Senior Football Championship Final, which left him unable to finish the game. "I couldn't keep any food or water down so I got a drip to stay hydrated. But that was actually great at the time because it completely distracted from the build-up to a final ... all you were worried about is, 'Am I going to be okay?' You're no thinking about the occasion itself. And then thankfully I pulled through and performed okay for the 50 minutes that I lasted".

McCaffrey missed the 2016 All-Ireland Senior Football Championship due his travels abroad. He travelled to Ethiopia, then Kenya, Zambia, Malawi and Tanzania.

In December 2016, McCaffrey confirmed that he would be available again for selection in 2017.

McCaffrey played in that year's All-Ireland final win but left the pitch early after sustaining what later proved to be an anterior cruciate ligament injury. His antics later in the evening as Michael Lyster interviewed Jim Gavin and Stephen Cluxton were much remarked upon. A month after the final, McCaffrey had surgery.

McCaffrey returned for Dublin against Longford as a substitute in June 2018. Another substitute appearance in the Leinster final against Laois followed, seeing him make two goal chances by himself. However, he did not find the net in that game.

He is a former self-admitted "horrific tackler" but the 2018 All-Ireland Senior Football Championship Final proved to be when he "figured out I'm actually a defender as opposed to some loose attacking player". His dispossession of Mattie Donnelly during injury time of that game offered evidence of this.

McCaffrey was named Man of the Match after his team's 2018 final victory. While being interviewed by Lyster for The Sunday Game highlights programme, a leak through the ceiling of the Gibson Hotel caused Lyster, McCaffrey and GAA President John Horan to be drenched in water live on air.

Interviewed the following day by journalists, McCaffrey reminded them: "This was the first time I've been on the pitch when the final whistle blew in an All-Ireland final. Incredible. It was so satisfying, such a relief".

Another All Star followed, as did a second Footballer of the Year nomination.

McCaffrey won the man of the match award in the drawn 2019 All-Ireland Senior Football Championship Final as well; a second consecutive award, "RTÉ veterans" were reported to be finding it difficult to recall such an occurrence ever before. He was top scorer (1–3) from open play. This compared with the 3–14 from his previous 38 championship games. The three points were also a classic hat-trick, sent over with fist and both feet. Defensively, he forced eight turnovers of possession.

McCaffrey left the Dublin panel ahead of the 2020 All-Ireland Senior Football Championship. He later described the drawn 2019 All-Ireland Senior Football Championship Final as the game that "broke me" but decided initially to remain when his former minor and under-21 manager Dessie Farrell was appointed as Jim Gavin's successor.

Honours

Team
 All-Ireland Senior Football Championship (5): 2013, 2015, 2017, 2018, 2019
 Leinster Senior Football Championship (6): 2013, 2014, 2015, 2017, 2018, 2019
 National Football League (3): 2013, 2014, 2015
 All-Ireland Under-21 Football Championship (2): 2012, 2014 (c)
 Leinster Under-21 Football Championship (2): 2012, 2014

Individual
 All-Ireland Senior Football Championship Final Man of the Match (2): 2018, 2019 (drawn game)
 The Sunday Game Player of the Year (1): 2015
 All Stars Young Footballer of the Year (1): 2013
 All Stars Footballer of the Year (1): 2015
 GAA GPA All Stars Awards (3): 2015, 2017, 2018
 UCD Alumni Award Winner Sport 2020

References

1993 births
Living people
Clontarf Gaelic footballers
Dublin inter-county Gaelic footballers
Gaelic football backs
Irish international rules football players
People educated at Belvedere College
People from Clontarf, Dublin
Sportspeople from Dublin (city)
21st-century Irish medical doctors
Winners of five All-Ireland medals (Gaelic football)